The Thermodesulfobacteriota are a phylum of thermophilic sulfate-reducing bacteria.

A pathogenic intracellular thermodesulfobacteriote has recently been identified.

Phylogeny

The phylogeny is based on phylogenomic analysis:

See also 
 List of bacterial orders
 List of bacteria genera

References

 
Bergey's volume 1
Bacteria phyla